The 1975 South Pacific Championships was an Association of Tennis Professionals men's tournament held on outdoor clay courts at the Royal South Yarra Tennis Club in Melbourne, Victoria, Australia that was part of the 1975 Grand Prix tennis circuit. It was the second edition of the tournament and was held from 6 October until 12 October 1975. Seventh-seeded Brian Gottfried won the singles title and earned $10,000 first-prize money.

Finals

Singles
 Brian Gottfried defeated  Harold Solomon 6–2, 7–6, 6–1
 It was Gottfried's 3rd singles title of the year and the 6th of his career.

Doubles
 Ross Case /  Geoff Masters defeated  Brian Gottfried /  Raúl Ramirez 6–4, 6–0

References

External links
 Draw information (ITF)

South Pacific Championships
South Pacific Championships, 1975
South Pacific Championships 
South Pacific Championships
South Pacific Tennis Classic